Mikko Markus Lundén is a Finnish politician currently serving in the Parliament of Finland for the Finns Party at the Finland Proper constituency.

References

Year of birth missing (living people)
Living people
Members of the Parliament of Finland (2019–23)
Finns Party politicians
21st-century Finnish politicians